Svetlana Viktorovna Bogdanova  (Светлана Викторовна Богданова, born 3 October 1976) is a Russian female water polo player. She was a member of the Russia women's national water polo team, playing as a driver.

She was a part of the  team at the 2004 Summer Olympics. On club level she played for Kinef Kirishi in Russia.

See also
 List of World Aquatics Championships medalists in water polo

References

External links
 
http://www.gettyimages.com/photos/svetlana-bogdanova?excludenudity=true&sort=mostpopular&mediatype=photography&phrase=svetlana%20bogdanova

1976 births
Living people
Russian female water polo players
Water polo players at the 2004 Summer Olympics
Olympic water polo players of Russia
People from Kirishi
Sportspeople from Leningrad Oblast